Thomas Hardy's Wessex is the fictional literary landscape created by the English author Thomas Hardy as the setting for his major novels, located in the south and southwest of England. Hardy named the area "Wessex" after the medieval Anglo-Saxon kingdom that existed in this part of that country prior to the unification of England by Æthelstan. Although the places that appear in his novels actually exist, in many cases he gave the place a fictional name. For example, Hardy's home town of Dorchester is called Casterbridge in his books, notably in The Mayor of Casterbridge. In an 1895 preface to the 1874 novel Far From the Madding Crowd he described Wessex as "a merely realistic dream country".

The actual definition of "Hardy's Wessex" varied widely throughout Hardy's career, and was not definitively settled until after he retired from writing novels. When he created the concept of a fictional Wessex, it consisted merely of the small area of Dorset in which Hardy grew up; by the time he wrote Jude the Obscure, the boundaries had extended to include all of Dorset, Wiltshire, Somerset, Devon, Hampshire, much of Berkshire, and some of Oxfordshire, with its most north-easterly point being Oxford (renamed "Christminster" in the novel). Cornwall was also referred to but named "Off Wessex". Similarly, the nature and significance of ideas of "Wessex" were developed over a long series of novels through a lengthy period of time. The idea of Wessex plays an important artistic role in Hardy's works (particularly his later novels), assisting the presentation of themes of progress, primitivism, sexuality, religion, nature and naturalism.  However, this is complicated by the economic role Wessex played in Hardy's career. Considering himself primarily to be a poet, Hardy wrote novels mostly to earn money. Books that could be marketed under the Hardy brand of "Wessex novels" were particularly lucrative, which gave rise to a tendency to sentimentalised, picturesque, populist descriptions of Wessex (which, as a glance through most tourist giftshops in the south-west reveals, remain popular with consumers today).

Hardy's resurrection of the name "Wessex" is largely responsible for the popular modern use of the term to describe the south-west region of England (with the exception of Cornwall and arguably Devon). Today, a panoply of organisations take their name from Hardy to describe their relationship to the area.  Hardy's conception of Wessex as a separate, cohesive geographical and political identity has proved powerful, although it was originally created purely as an artistic conceit, and has spawned a lucrative tourist trade, and even a devolutionist Wessex Regionalist Party.

Thomas Hardy's Wessex names

Wessex regions and actual English counties

(Note: The Isle of Wight, although today a separate administrative county, was considered to be a part of the county of Hampshire – and thus Upper Wessex – during Thomas Hardy's lifetime. Likewise, Alfredston (Wantage) and the surrounding area in North Wessex was part of Berkshire prior to the 1974 boundary changes but now lies in Oxfordshire.)

Outer Wessex is sometimes referred to as Nether Wessex.

Specific places in Thomas Hardy's Wessex

Key to references for the place name table
The abbreviations for Thomas Hardy's novels that are used in the table are as follows:
 DR – Desperate Remedies (1871)
 UtGT – Under the Greenwood Tree (1872)
 PoBE – A Pair of Blue Eyes (1873)
 FftMC – Far from the Madding Crowd (1874)
 HoE – The Hand of Ethelberta (1876)
 RotN – The Return of the Native (1878)
 TM – The Trumpet-Major (1880)
 L – A Laodicean (1881)
 ToaT – Two on a Tower (1882)
 MoC – The Mayor of Casterbridge (1886)
 W – The Woodlanders (1887)
 WT – Wessex Tales (1888)
 TotD – Tess of the d'Urbervilles (1891)
 JtO – Jude the Obscure (1895)
 WB – The Well-Beloved (1897)
 WP – Wessex Poems and Other Verses (1898)

Table of Wessex place-names, their actual places, and their appearance in Hardy's novels

In art and books
Artists such as Walter Tyndale, Edmund Hort New, Charles George Harper and others, have painted or drawn the landscapes, places and buildings described in Hardy's novels. Their work was used to illustrate books exploring the real-life countryside on which the fictional county of Wessex was based:

B. C. A. Windle & E. H. New (ill.). The Wessex of Thomas Hardy (London, New York, J. Lane, 1902).
Charles G. Harper. The Hardy country; literary landmarks of the Wessex novels (London, A. & C. Black, 1904).
Clive Holland. Wessex (A & C Black, 1906).
Sidney Heath.The Heart of Wessex (Blackie & Son, 1910?).
Charles G. Harper. Wessex ("Beautiful Britain", London: A. & C. Black, 1911).
R. Thurston Hopkins & E. Harries (ill.). Thomas Hardy's Dorset (New York: D. Appleton and co. 1922).
Hermann Lea. Thomas Hardy's Wessex (London, Macmillan and co. 1911).
Ralph Pite, Hardy's geography: Wessex and the regional novel.  Palgrave, 2002.
Andrew D. Radford, Mapping the Wessex novel: landscape, history and the parochial in British literature, 1870–1940. (London; New York: Continuum International Pub., 2010.
Walter Tyndale. Hardy country water-colours (A & C Black, 19??).
Barry J Cade. Thomas Hardy's Locations (Casterbridge Publishing Limited 2015) A full colour tourist guide to the places Hardy had in mind when he wrote "The Mayor of Casterbridge" and "Far from the Madding Crowd."

References

External links
 Birgit Plietzsch, "Maps of Wessex" (archived page retrieved from University of St Andrews web page)
 Dana Huntley, "Thomas Hardy’s Wessex Country".  British Heritage Travel page, 27 January 2021
 "Hardy's Wessex", Dorset Guide
 "Hardy's Wessex", The Thomas Hardy Society
 Ceri Hunter, "Where is Thomas Hardy's Wessex?"  The National Trust

Wessex
Hardy's Wessex
Hardy's Wessex
Hardy's Wessex
Hardy's Wessex
Hardy's Wessex